Okenia mija is a species of sea slug, specifically a dorid nudibranch, a marine gastropod mollusc in the family Goniodorididae.

Distribution
This species was described from south-eastern Australia. It is known from New South Wales, Victoria and Tasmania.

Description
This Okenia has a narrow body and seven pairs of short lateral papillae. There are many papillae on the back, between the rhinophores and the gills and some on the sides of the body. The body is translucent and has some small spots of brown and white pigment. It is similar in shape and arrangement of the papillae to Okenia angelensis, Okenia zoobotryon, Okenia harastii and Okenia distincta.

Ecology
The diet of this species is a bryozoan, Amathia wilsoni.

References

Goniodorididae
Gastropods described in 1967